Amberpet is one of the oldest suburbs of Hyderabad, India. Amberpet lies adjacent to the famous Osmania University. It is also a Mandal in Hyderabad District. Its area stretches from Kachiguda to Ramanthapur in the East, and from 6 NO TO MALAKPET in the South. One of the oldest area of, Hyderabad, India.

Introduction 

Amberpet is the combination of two distinct words; 'Amber', which is Persian for ambergis, and 'pet', which is Urdu for locale, and the word Amberpet literally translates into "the land of ambergis". Amber also refers to sky, and hence, Amberpet may also means highland or land of the skies. Amberpet is home to the world-famous and one of the oldest university in the Indian Sub-continent i.e., Osmania University, which is built in 1908 by the last NIZAM of Hyderabad State, HEH Mir Osman Ali Khan Bahadur [CBE]

Its area stretches from Kachiguda in the West to Ramanthapur in the East, and from Vidyanagar in the north to Azadnagar in the South. The Civil Police Lines Special Armed Reserve (CPL-SAR) of the Andhra Pradesh Police Academy is also located adjacent to the Amber Baba Dargah. The area was populated as a local market for all the household needs catering to all nearby locales at very affordable prices. Now, these have been replaced by Malls, Super Markets, hi-end businesses lining the main road.

History 

Established as a farming community on the banks of the northern side of the Musi river in the 18th century, Amberpet lent its name to the famous Sufi saint Amber Baba, who is also believed to be one of the advisers to Mughal Emperor Aurangazeb at that time. The Dargah of Amber baba is located right on the main road, which draws crowd from all over the place on its annual Urs. Many believe that this place, once barren, was miraculously propagated and populated into dense forest, fruit-growing fields, after Sufi Saint Amber baba made this place his final destination. Once a sub-urban area, this place has turned into a major hub for trade and Educational Institutes.

Many masjids of Amberpet belongs to the Qutub Shahi era and it is line up the main road leading to Warangal. Amberpet is home to second largest mosque in the city i.e. Qutub Shahi Masjid also known as Bade Masjid. Under the leadership of Syed Chand Patel Sahab, this mosque was expanded to accommodate more than 1,000 worshipers and now it is considered largest Mosque next to Makkah Masjid near Charminar in terms of worshippers. Osmania Public School was also built during the expansion of Qutub Shahi Masjid which is adjacent to the mosque

Amberpet is rich in its cultural and religious image. This place is surrounded by many temples. Sri Mahankali Temple (Amberpet Main Road), Jai Veer Hanuman Temple (Beside Sri Ramana Theatre), Sri Ram Mandir (6 no. X roads), Shivam Temple (Shivam Road) are some of the frequently visited temples by the devotees of Amberpet. All religious functions and ceremonies are celebrated in full attendance of the devotees.

Landmarks 
 Guruvaurappan Temple
 Sri Ramana Theatre
 Quadri Bagh
 Shivam temple
 Sufi Amber Baba Dargah 
 Gandhi Statue
 MCH Ground/Eid Gah
 Central Police Lines (CPL) 
 Irani Hotel
 Jaiswal Garden
 Ali Cafe Circle
 Badi Masjid 
 Sri Mahankali Temple
 MCH Kaaman
 Owaisi Nagar
 Patel Nagar 
 Bilal Masjid
 Masjid E Hussani (Ahmed Nagar)

Transport 
Amberpet is well-connected by road networks and the Hyderabad-Warangal state highway passes through Amberpet. The closest railway network is of 1 km away i.e. Kachiguda railway station which is in close proximity to the Mumbai-Vijaywada national highway. The closest MMTS train station is around a kilometer away at Kachiguda or Vidyanagar.

TSRTC connects buses from various parts of the city to Amberpet. 107, 71, 115 and 113 bus services pass through Amberpet.

References

External links
 Amberpet Farming Community

Neighbourhoods in Hyderabad, India